The 1950–51 Sheffield Shield season was the 49th season of the Sheffield Shield, the domestic first-class cricket competition of Australia. Victoria won the championship.

Table

Statistics

Most Runs
Lindsay Hassett 770

Most Wickets
Colin McCool 46

References

Sheffield Shield
Sheffield Shield
Sheffield Shield seasons